Klopfenstein is a surname. Notable people with the surname include:

Amélie Klopfenstein (born 2002), Swiss alpine skier
Joe Klopfenstein (born 1983), American football player
Scott Klopfenstein (born 1977), American singer and multi-instrument musician
Willy Klopfenstein (1921–2002), Swiss ski jumper